The 1999 Miami Hurricanes baseball team represented the University of Miami in the 1999 NCAA Division I baseball season. The team was coached by Jim Morris in his 6th season.

The Hurricanes won the College World Series, defeating the Florida State Seminoles in the championship game.

Roster

Schedule

Awards and honors 
Manny Crespo
College World Series All-Tournament Team

Lale Esquivel
College World Series All-Tournament Team

Bobby Hill
College World Series All-Tournament Team

Michael Neu
College World Series All-Tournament Team

Mike Rodriguez
Freshman All-America

Hurricanes in the 1999 MLB Draft
The following members of the Miami baseball program were drafted in the 1999 Major League Baseball Draft.

References

Miami Hurricanes
Miami Hurricanes baseball seasons
College World Series seasons
NCAA Division I Baseball Championship seasons
Miami Hurricanes baseball team
Miami